Gbinle Dixing is a chiefdom in Kambia District of Sierra Leone with a population of 19,569. Its principal town is Tawuya.

References

Chiefdoms of Sierra Leone
Northern Province, Sierra Leone